Mary Ann Zynsky, better known as Toots Zynsky, (born 1951) is an American glass artist.

Early life
A native of Boston, Zynsky was known as "Toots" almost from the time she was born. She studied at the Rhode Island School of Design, receiving her BFA before traveling to Seattle to work at the Pilchuck Glass School under Dale Chihuly; she has continued to return there as an instructor. She spent six months in the 1980s in Ghana researching the local music.

Career
Her work is known for featuring the filet-de-verre technique, in which fine threads are pulled from glass canes. Zynsky has shown her work at exhibitions worldwide. She designed the torch, in the shape of a prosthetic limb, for the 2002 Paralympic Winter Games. She was a resident artist at the Corning Museum of Glass in 2016. In 2008 she was named to the American Craft Council College of Fellows.

Her work is included in the collections of the Smithsonian American Art Museum and the Seattle Art Museum.

References

1951 births
Living people
American glass artists
Women glass artists
20th-century American artists
20th-century American women artists
21st-century American artists
21st-century American women artists
Artists from Boston
Rhode Island School of Design alumni
Fellows of the American Craft Council